Long Beach Jane Doe (known locally as Jane Doe 40) is an unidentified murder victim whose body was found on May 28, 1974. Her suspected murderer was arrested in 2013, but she has never been identified, despite extensive investigation.

Discovery of the body
The strangled body of a young woman was found on May 28, 1974, on the jetty of Alamitos Beach in Long Beach, California.

She was estimated to be between 18 and 28 years old and had been raped. Basic physical examination showed she was about 5 feet 5 inches tall and weighed about 118 pounds. The victim was white with possible Hispanic ancestry, as she had brown or black hair and brown eyes. She also had a unique scar on the back of her left hand, which was shaped like the letter T. She also had an inch-long scar on the back of her left thigh.

She was wearing a white gold, 14-karat engagement ring with a small diamond. She was clothed in a pinkish-orange suit with a faux black fur coat and calf-high suede boots.

The only items the Jane Doe carried were a house key and padlock key. The padlock key was attached to a broken chain.

Investigation

No missing persons have been found who match the victim's description. Investigators have the girl's DNA and fingerprints. A forensic facial reconstruction was created by the National Center for Missing and Exploited Children to assist with identification.

Arrest of Gary Stamp
Police received a confession from a Texas man who claimed he had assisted with dumping the victim's body. He led authorities to another suspect.

On May 20, 2013, Gary Stamp, aged 61, was arrested. He confessed to the murder but was not certain of her name, which he suggested may have been "Anna." Stamp was arraigned on June 12, 2013, in Superior Court.

Stamp told police that he had met her at a bar, which coincided with the prior evidence that the victim was possibly seen at an establishment of this nature. Stamp died in January 2014 of cancer in police custody.

See also
List of unsolved murders

Gallery

References

External links

1974 deaths
1974 in California
1974 murders in the United States
1970s crimes in California
1970s in Los Angeles County, California
20th-century births
20th-century women
Deaths by strangulation in the United States
Female murder victims
Incidents of violence against women
May 1974 crimes
Murder in Los Angeles County, California
People from Long Beach, California
Rape in the 1970s
Unidentified murder victims in California
Unsolved murders in the United States
Year of birth unknown
History of women in California